Laminas Project (formerly Zend Framework or ZF) is an open source, object-oriented web application framework implemented in PHP 7 and licensed under the New BSD License. The framework is basically a collection of professional PHP-based packages. The framework uses various packages by the use of Composer as part of its package dependency managers; some of them are PHPUnit for testing all packages, Travis CI for continuous Integration Services. Laminas provides to users a support of the model–view–controller (MVC) in combination with Front Controller solution. MVC implementation in Laminas has five main areas. The router and dispatcher functions to decide which controller to run based on data from URL, and controller functions in combination with the model and view to develop and create the final web page.

On 17 April 2019 it was announced that the framework is transitioning into an open source project hosted by the Linux Foundation to be known as Laminas.

License
Laminas is licensed under the Open Source Initiative (OSI)-approved New BSD License. All new contributions are required to be accompanied with Developer Certificate of Origin affirmation.

Zend Framework also licensed under New BSD License. For ZF1 all code contributors were required to sign a Contributor License Agreement (CLA) based on the Apache Software Foundation’s CLA. The licensing and contribution policies were established to prevent intellectual property issues for commercial ZF users, according to Zend's Andi Gutmans. ZF2 and later is CLA free.

Components and versioning
Laminas Project follows semantic versioning. Framework components are versioned independently and released as separate Composer packages. Dependencies between framework components are declared as Composer dependencies using semantic versioning ranges.

Prior to Zend Framework version 2.5 all components shared the same version. Starting with Zend Framework version 2.5, components were split into independently versioned packages and zendframework/zendframework converted into a Composer meta-package.
Framework components introduced after the split started at version 1.0 while existing components continued from 2.5. New components were not added to the meta-package and meta-package itself was discontinued after 3.0.0 release.

Zend Framework 3 was the last release before framework wide versioning was discontinued.  In Zend Framework 3 major versions of individual components did not match framework version anymore and caused confusion. Some components such as zend-mvc and zend-servicemanager received matching major version release but other remained on version 2 while newly introduced zend-diactoros, zend-stratigility and zend-expressive were at major version 1.

Laminas Project does not carry a single framework version. Components transitioned from Zend Framework continued with existing versions and had all past releases migrated from their counterparts. zendframework/zendframework meta-package does not have a counterpart in Laminas. 

Laminas includes following components:

Installation 
Officially supported install method is via Composer package manager.

Laminas provides meta-package that includes 61 component but recommended way is to install required framework components individually. Composer will resolve and install all additional dependencies.

For instance, if you need MVC package, you can install with the following command:$ composer require zendframework/zend-mvcFull list of components is available in Zend Framework documentation.

Anatomy of the framework
Laminas follows configuration-over-convention approach and does not impose any particular application structure. Skeleton applications for zend-mvc and zend-expressive are available and provide everything necessary to run applications and to serve as a good starting point.

Sponsor and partners
Zend Technologies, co-founded by PHP core contributors Andi Gutmans and Zeev Suraski, was the original corporate sponsor of Zend Framework. Technology partners include IBM, Google, Microsoft, Adobe Systems, and StrikeIron.

Features
Laminas features include:
 All components are fully object-oriented PHP 5 and are E_STRICT compliant, which helps in the development of building tests and writing codes in a bug-free and crash-proof application manner.
 Use-at-will architecture with loosely coupled components and minimal interdependencies
 Extensible MVC implementation supporting layouts and PHP-based templates by default
 Support for multiple database systems and vendors, including MariaDB, MySQL, Oracle, IBM Db2, Microsoft SQL Server, PostgreSQL, SQLite, and Informix Dynamic Server
 Email composition and delivery, retrieval via mbox, Maildir, POP3 and IMAP4
 Flexible caching sub-system with support for many types of backends, such as memory or a file system.
 With the help of remote procedure call (RPC) and REST(Representational State Transfer) services, Zend Apigility helps developers to create APIs, authentication of APIs, documentation of APIs, Easy Modification

Development of applications
Laminas applications can run on any PHP stack that fulfills the technical requirements. Zend Technologies provides a PHP stack, Zend Server (or Zend Server Community Edition), which is advertised to be optimized for running Laminas applications. Zend Server includes Zend Framework in its installers, along with PHP and all required extensions. According to Zend Technologies, Zend Server provides improved performance for PHP and especially Zend Framework applications through opcode acceleration and several caching capabilities, and includes application monitoring and diagnostics facilities. Zend Studio is an IDE that includes features specifically to integrate with Zend Framework. It provides an MVC view, MVC code generation based on Zend_Tool (a component of the Zend Framework), a code formatter, code completion, parameter assist, and more. Zend Studio is not free software, whereas the Zend Framework and Zend Server Community Edition are free. Zend Server is compatible with common debugging tools such as Xdebug. Other developers may want to use a different PHP stack and another IDE such as Eclipse PDT which works well together with Zend Server. A pre configured, free version of Eclipse PDT with Zend Debug is available on the Zend web site.

Code, documentation, and test standards
Code contributions to Laminas are subject to rigorous code, documentation, and test standards. All code must meet project coding standards and unit tests must reach 80% code coverage before the corresponding code may be moved to the release branch.

Simple cloud API

On September 22, 2009, Zend Technologies announced  that it would be working with technology partners including Microsoft, IBM, Rackspace, Nirvanix, and GoGrid along with the Zend Framework community to develop a common API to cloud application services called the Simple Cloud API. This project is part of Zend Framework and will be hosted on the Zend Framework website, but a separate site called simplecloud.org has been launched to discuss and download the most current versions of the API. The Simple Cloud API and several Cloud Services are included in Zend Framework. The adapters to popular cloud services have reached production quality.

Current development
Zend Framework 3.0 was released on June 28, 2016. It includes new components like a JSON RPC server, a XML to JSON converter, PSR-7 functionality, and compatibility with PHP 7.  Zend Framework 3.0 runs up to 4 times faster than Zend Framework 2, and the packages have been decoupled to allow for greater reuse. The contributors of Zend Framework are actively encouraging the use of Zend Framework version 3.x. The stated end of life for Zend Framework 1 is 2016-09-28, and for Zend Framework 2 is 2018-03-31. The first development release of Zend Framework 2.0 was released on August 6, 2010. Changes made in this release were the removal of require_once statements, migration to PHP 5.3 namespaces, a refactored test suite, a rewritten Zend\Session, and the addition of the new Zend\Stdlib. The second development release was on November 3, 2010. The first stable release of Zend Framework 2.0 was released 5 September 2012.

See also 

 Comparison of web frameworks
 New BSD License
 Zend Server
 Zend Studio

References

External links

Zend Framework

Free computer libraries
Free content management systems
PHP frameworks
Software using the BSD license
Web frameworks